Vis-en-Artois is a commune in the Pas-de-Calais department in the Hauts-de-France region of France.

Geography

History

World War I deeply affected the town, which was under the thumb of German troops from September 30, 1914 until its liberation by Canadian forces on 24 August 1918.

During the year 1918 the village was completely destroyed. The people who had not fled before the arrival of the invading troops were evacuated to Belgium.

On 24 September 1920, Vis-en-Artois received the Croix de Guerre.

Population

Places of interest
 The church of St.Martin, rebuilt, along with much of the village, after World War I.
 The war memorial, inaugurated on August 10, 1924.
 For the Vis-En-Artois British Cemetery, Haucourt see Haucourt.

See also
Communes of the Pas-de-Calais department

References

External links

  Vis-en-Artois official website 

Visenartois